Early Theatre is a peer-reviewed academic journal specialising in the study of medieval and early modern theatre and drama, particularly in England, Scotland, Ireland, and Wales. The journal originally evolved out of the REED Newsletter, which was published biannually by the Records of Early English Drama, and the first issue was published in 1998. It is edited by Helen Ostovich.

External links

References

English-language journals
Publications established in 1998
Arts journals
Biannual journals